

William Bona Anima or Bonne-Âme (died 1110) was a medieval archbishop of Rouen. He served from 1079 to 1110.

William was the son of Radbod, the bishop of Sées and was a canon at Rouen as well as an archdeacon in that diocese. He then entered a monastery and became abbot of the monastery of Saint-Etienne in Caen from 1070 to 1079. He then was named archbishop of Rouen, where he served from 1079 to 1110.

References

Sources
 

Archbishops of Rouen
1110 deaths
Year of birth unknown